Battle of Accra may refer to:

Either of the following battles in the First British-Ashanti War:
 The First Battle of Accra in 1824
 The Second Battle of Accra in 1825